Sword-and-sandal, also known as peplum (pepla plural), is a subgenre of largely Italian-made historical, mythological, or Biblical epics mostly set in the Greco-Roman antiquity or the Middle Ages. These films attempted to emulate the big-budget Hollywood historical epics of the time, such as Samson and Delilah (1949), Quo Vadis (1951), The Robe (1953), The Ten Commandments (1956), Ben-Hur (1959), Spartacus (1960), and Cleopatra (1963).  These films dominated the Italian film industry from 1958 to 1965, eventually being replaced in 1965 by spaghetti Western and Eurospy films.

The term "peplum" (a Latin word referring to the Ancient Greek garment peplos), was introduced by French film critics in the 1960s. The terms "peplum" and "sword-and-sandal" were used in a condescending way by film critics. Later, the terms were embraced by fans of the films, similar to the terms "spaghetti Western" or "shoot-'em-ups". In their English versions, peplum films can be immediately differentiated from their Hollywood counterparts by their use of "clumsy and inadequate" English language dubbing. A 100-minute documentary on the history of Italy's peplum genre was produced and directed by Antonio Avati in 1977 entitled Kolossal: i magnifici Maciste (aka Kino Kolossal).

Genre characteristics

Sword-and-sandal films are a specific class of Italian adventure films that have subjects set in Biblical or classical antiquity, often with plots based more or less loosely on Greco-Roman history or the other contemporary cultures of the time, such as the Egyptians, Assyrians, and Etruscans, as well as medieval times. Not all of the films were fantasy-based by any means. Many of the plots featured actual historical personalities such as Julius Caesar, Cleopatra, and Hannibal, although great liberties were taken with the storylines. Gladiators and slaves rebelling against tyrannical rulers, pirates and swashbucklers were also popular subjects.

As Robert Rushing defines it, peplum, "in its most stereotypical form, [...] depicts muscle-bound heroes (professional bodybuilders, athletes, wrestlers, or brawny actors) in mythological antiquity, fighting fantastic monsters and saving scantily clad beauties. Rather than lavish epics set in the classical world, they are low-budget films that focus on the hero's extraordinary body." Thus, most sword-and-sandal films featured a superhumanly strong man as the protagonist, such as Hercules, Samson, Goliath, Ursus or Italy's own popular folk hero Maciste. In addition, the plots typically involved two women vying for the affection of the bodybuilder hero: the good love interest (a damsel in distress needing rescue), and an evil femme fatale queen who sought to dominate the hero.

Also, the films typically featured an ambitious ruler who would ascend the throne by murdering those who stood in his path, and often it was only the muscular hero who could depose him. Thus the hero's often political goal: "to restore a legitimate sovereign against an evil dictator."

Many of the peplum films involved a clash between two populations, one civilized and the other barbaric, which typically included a scene of a village or city being burned to the ground by invaders. For their musical content, most films contained a colorful dancing girls sequence, meant to underline pagan decadence.

Precursors of the sword-and-sandal wave (pre-1958)

Italian films of the silent era
Italian filmmakers paved the way for the peplum genre with some of the earliest silent films dealing with the subject, including the following:
 The Sack of Rome (1905)
 Agrippina (1911)
 The Fall of Troy (1911)
 The Queen of Nineveh (1911, directed by Luigi Maggi)
 Brutus (1911)
 Quo Vadis  (1913, directed by Enrico Guazzoni)
 Antony and Cleopatra (1913)
 Cabiria (1914, directed by Giovanni Pastrone)
 Julius Caesar (1914)
 Saffo (Sappho, 1918, directed by Antonio Molinari)
 The Crusaders (1918)
 Fabiola (1918) directed by Enrico Guazzoni
 Attila (1919, directed by F. Mari)
 Venere (Venus, 1919, directed by Antonio Molinari)
 Il mistero di Osiris (The Mystery of Osiris, 1919) directed by Antonio Molinari
 Giuliano l'Apostata (1919, directed by Ugo Falena)
 Giuditta e Oloferne (Judith and Holofernes, 1920) directed by Antonio Molinari
 The Sack of Rome, (1920) directed by Enrico Guazzoni
 Messalina, (1924) directed by Enrico Guazzoni
 Gli ultimi giorni di Pompei (The Last Days of Pompeii (1926) directed by Carmine Gallone and Amleto Palermi)

The silent Maciste films (1914–1927)
The 1914 Italian silent film Cabiria was one of the first films set in antiquity to make use of a massively muscled character, Maciste (played by actor Bartolomeo Pagano), who served in this premiere film as the hero's slavishly loyal sidekick. Maciste became the public's favorite character in the film however, and Pagano was called back many times to reprise the role. The Maciste character appeared in at least two dozen Italian silent films from 1914 through 1926, all of which featured a protagonist named Maciste although the films were set in many different time periods and geographical locations.

Here is a complete list of the silent Maciste films in chronological order:
 Cabiria (1914) introduced the Maciste character
 Maciste (1915)  "The Marvelous Maciste"
 Maciste bersagliere ("Maciste the Ranger", 1916)
 Maciste alpino ("Maciste The Warrior", 1916)
 Maciste atleta ("Maciste the Athlete", 1917)
 Maciste medium ("Maciste the Clairvoyant", 1917)
 Maciste poliziotto ("Maciste the Detective", 1917)
 Maciste turista ("Maciste the Tourist", 1917)
 Maciste sonnambulo ("Maciste the Sleepwalker", 1918)
 La Rivincita di Maciste ("The Revenge of Maciste", 1919)
 Il Testamento di Maciste ("Maciste's Will", 1919)
 Il Viaggio di Maciste ("Maciste's Journey", 1919)
 Maciste I ("Maciste the First", 1919)
 Maciste contro la morte ("Maciste vs Death", 1919)
 Maciste innamorato ("Maciste in Love", 1919)
 Maciste in vacanza ("Maciste on Vacation", 1920)
 Maciste salvato dalle acque ("Maciste Rescued from the Waters", 1920)
 Maciste e la figlia del re della plata ("Maciste and the Silver King's Daughter", 1922)
 Maciste und die Japanerin ("Maciste and the Japanese", 1922)
 Maciste contro Maciste ("Maciste vs. Maciste", 1923)
 Maciste und die chinesische truhe ("Maciste and the Chinese Trunk", 1923)
 Maciste e il nipote di America ("Maciste's American Nephew", 1924)
 Maciste imperatore ("Emperor Maciste", 1924)
 Maciste contro lo sceicco ("Maciste vs. the Sheik", 1925)
 Maciste all'inferno ("Maciste in Hell", 1925)
 Maciste nella gabbia dei leoni ("Maciste in the Lions' Den", 1926)
 il Gigante delle Dolemite ("The Giant From the Dolomite", released in 1927)

Italian fascist and post-war historical epics (1937-1956)

The Italian film industry released several historical films in the early sound era, such as the big-budget Scipione l'Africano (Scipio Africanus: The Defeat of Hannibal) in 1937. In 1949, the postwar Italian film industry remade Fabiola (which had been previously filmed twice in the silent era). The film was released in the United Kingdom and in the United States in 1951 in an edited, English-dubbed version. Fabiola was an Italian-French co-production like the following films The Last Days of Pompeii (1950) and Messalina (1951).

During the 1950s, a number of American historical epics shot in Italy were released. In 1951, MGM producer Sam Zimbalist cleverly used the lower production costs, use of frozen funds and the expertise of the Italian film industry to shoot the large-scale Technicolor epic Quo Vadis in Rome. In addition to its fictional account linking the Great Fire of Rome, the Persecution of Christians in the Roman Empire and Emperor Nero, the film - following the novel "Quo vadis" by the Polish writer Henryk Sienkiewicz - featured also a mighty protagonist named Ursus (Italian filmmakers later made several pepla in the 1960s exploiting the Ursus character).   MGM also planned Ben Hur to be filmed in Italy as early as 1952.

Riccardo Freda's Sins of Rome was filmed in 1953 and released by RKO in an edited, English-dubbed version the following year. Unlike Quo Vadis, there were no American actors or production crew.  The Anthony Quinn film Attila (directed by Pietro Francisci in 1954), the Kirk Douglas epic Ulysses (co-directed by an uncredited Mario Bava in 1954) and Helen of Troy (directed by Robert Wise with Sergio Leone as an uncredited second unit director in 1955) were the first of the big peplum films of the 1950s. Riccardo Freda directed another peplum, Theodora, Slave Empress in 1954, starring his wife Gianna Maria Canale. Howard Hawks directed his Land of the Pharaohs (starring Joan Collins) in Italy and Egypt in 1955. Robert Rossen made his film Alexander the Great in Egypt in 1956, with a music score by famed Italian composer Mario Nascimbene.

The main sword-and-sandal period (1958-1965)

To cash in on the success of the Kirk Douglas film Ulysses, Pietro Francisci planned to make a film about Hercules, but searched unsuccessfully for years for a physically convincing yet experienced actor. His daughter spotted American bodybuilder Steve Reeves in the American film Athena and he was hired to play Hercules in 1957 when the film was made. (Reeves was paid $10,000 to star in the film).

The genre's instantaneous growth began with the U.S. theatrical release of Hercules in 1959. American producer Joseph E. Levine acquired the U.S. distribution rights for $120,000, spent $1 million promoting the film and made more than $5 million profit. This spawned the 1959 Steve Reeves sequel Hercules Unchained, the 1959 re-release of Cecil B. DeMille's Samson and Delilah (1949), and dozens of imitations that followed in their wake. Italian filmmakers resurrected their 1920s Maciste character in a brand new 1960s sound film series (1960–1964), followed rapidly by Ursus, Samson, Goliath and various other mighty-muscled heroes.

Almost all peplum films of this period featured bodybuilder stars, the most popular being Steve Reeves, Reg Park and Gordon Scott. Some of these stars, such as Mickey Hargitay, Reg Lewis, Mark Forest, Gordon Mitchell and Dan Vadis, had starred in Mae West's touring stage review in the United States in the 1950s. Bodybuilders of Italian origin, on the other hand, would adopt English pseudonyms for the screen; thus, stuntman Sergio Ciani became Alan Steel, and ex-gondolier Adriano Bellini was called Kirk Morris.

To be sure, many of the films enjoyed widespread popularity among general audiences, and had production values that were typical for popular films of their day. Some films included frequent re-use of the impressive film sets that had been created for Ben-Hur and Cleopatra.

Although many of the bigger budget pepla were released theatrically in the US, fourteen of them were released directly to Embassy Pictures television in a syndicated TV package called The Sons of Hercules. Since few American viewers had a familiarity with Italian film heroes such as Maciste or Ursus, the characters were renamed and the films molded into a series of sorts by splicing on the same opening and closing theme song and newly designed voice-over narration that attempted to link the protagonist of each film to the Hercules mythos.  These films ran on Saturday afternoons in the 1960s.

Peplum films were, and still are, often ridiculed for their low budgets and bad English dubbing. The contrived plots, poorly overdubbed dialogue, novice acting skills of the bodybuilder leads, and primitive special effects that were often inadequate to depict the mythological creatures on screen all conspire to give these films a certain camp appeal now. In the 1990s, several of them have been subjects of riffing and satire in the United States comedy series Mystery Science Theater 3000.

However, in the early 1960s, a group of French critics, mostly writing for the Cahiers du cinéma, such as Luc Moullet, started to celebrate the genre and some of its directors, including Vittorio Cottafavi, Riccardo Freda, Mario Bava, Pietro Francisci, Duccio Tessari, and Sergio Leone. Not only directors, but also some of the screenwriters, often put together in teams, worked past the typically formulaic plot structure to include a mixture of "bits of philosophical readings and scraps of psychoanalysis, reflections on the biggest political systems, the fate of the world and humanity, fatalistic notions of accepting the will of destiny and the gods, anthropocentric belief in the powers of the human physique, and brilliant syntheses of military treatises".

With reference to the genre's free use of ancient mythology and other influences, Italian director Vittorio Cottafavi, who directed a number of peplum films, used the term "neo-mythologism".

Hercules series (1958–1965)

A series of 19 Hercules movies were made in Italy in the late '50s and early '60s. The films were all sequels to the successful Steve Reeves peplum Hercules (1958), but with the exception of Hercules Unchained, each film was a stand-alone story not connected to the others. The actors who played Hercules in these films were Steve Reeves followed by Gordon Scott, Kirk Morris, Mickey Hargitay, Mark Forest, Alan Steel, Dan Vadis, Brad Harris, Reg Park, Peter Lupus (billed as Rock Stevens) and Mike Lane. In a 1997 interview, Reeves said he felt his two Hercules films could not be topped by another sequel, so he declined to do any more Hercules films.

The films are listed below by their American release titles, and the titles in parentheses are their original Italian titles with an approximate English translation. Dates shown are the original Italian theatrical release dates, not the U.S. release dates (which were years later in some cases).
 Hercules (Le fatiche di Ercole / The Labors of Hercules, 1958) starring Steve Reeves
 Hercules Unchained (Ercole e la regina di Lidia / Hercules and the Queen of Lydia, 1959) starring Steve Reeves
 Goliath and the Dragon (La vendetta di Ercole / The Revenge of Hercules, 1960) starring Mark Forest as Hercules (Hercules' name was changed to Goliath when this film was dubbed in English and distributed in the U.S.)
 Hercules Vs The Hydra (Gli amori di Ercole / The Loves of Hercules, 1960) co-starring Mickey Hargitay (as Hercules) and Jayne Mansfield
 Hercules and the Captive Women (Ercole alla conquista di Atlantide / Hercules at the Conquest of Atlantis, 1961) starring Reg Park as Hercules (alternate U.S. title: Hercules and the Haunted Women)
 Hercules in the Haunted World (Ercole al centro della terra / Hercules at the Center of the Earth, 1961) directed by Mario Bava, starring Reg Park as Hercules
 Hercules in the Vale of Woe (Maciste contro Ercole nella valle dei guai / Maciste vs Hercules in the Vale of Woe) comedy starring Frank Gordon as Hercules, 1961
 Ulysses Against the Son of Hercules (Ulisse contro Ercole / Ulysses vs. Hercules) starring Mike Lane as Hercules, 1962
 The Fury of Hercules (La furia di Ercole / The Fury of Hercules) starring Brad Harris as Hercules, 1962 (alternate U.S. title: The Fury of Samson)
 Hercules, Samson and Ulysses (Ercole sfida Sansone / Hercules Challenges Samson) starring Kirk Morris as Hercules, 1963
 Hercules Against Moloch (Ercole contro Molock / Hercules vs. Molock) starring Gordon Scott as Hercules, 1963 ( The Conquest of Mycenae)
 Son of Hercules in the Land of Darkness (Ercole l'invincibile / Hercules the Invincible) starring Dan Vadis as Hercules, 1964. (this was originally a Hercules film that was re-titled for inclusion in the U.S. syndicated TV package The Sons of Hercules).
 Hercules vs The Giant Warriors (il trionfo di Ercole / The Triumph of Hercules) starring Dan Vadis as Hercules, 1964 (alternate U.S. title: Hercules and the Ten Avengers)
 Hercules Against Rome (Ercole contro Roma / Hercules vs. Rome) starring Alan Steel as Hercules, 1964
 Hercules Against the Sons of the Sun (Ercole contro i figli del sole / Hercules vs. the Sons of the Sun) starring Mark Forest as Hercules, 1964
 Samson and His Mighty Challenge (Ercole, Sansone, Maciste e Ursus: gli invincibili / Hercules, Samson, Maciste and Ursus: The Invincibles) starring Alan Steel as Hercules, 1964 ( Combate dei Gigantes or Le Grand Defi)
 Hercules and the Tyrants of Babylon (Ercole contro i tiranni di Babilonia / Hercules vs. the Tyrants of Babylon) starring Rock Stevens as Hercules, 1964
 Hercules and the Princess of Troy (no Italian title) starring Gordon Scott as Hercules, 1965 ( Hercules vs. the Sea Monster; this U.S./ Italian co-production was made as a pilot for a Charles Band-produced TV series that never materialized and it was later distributed as a feature film)
 Hercules the Avenger (Sfida dei giganti / Challenge of the Giants) starring Reg Park as Hercules, 1965 (this film was composed mostly of re-edited footage from the two 1961 Reg Park Hercules films)

A number of English-dubbed Italian films that featured the word "Hercules" in the title were not made as Hercules movies originally, such as:
 Hercules Against the Moon Men, Hercules Against the Barbarians, Hercules Against the Mongols and Hercules of the Desert were all originally Maciste films. (See "Maciste" section below)
 Hercules and the Black Pirate and Hercules and the Treasure of the Incas were both re-titled Samson movies. (See "Samson" section below)
 Hercules, Prisoner of Evil was actually a re-titled Ursus film. (See "Ursus" section below)
 Hercules and the Masked Rider was actually a re-titled Goliath movie. (See "Goliath" section below)
None of these films in their original Italian versions involved the Hercules character in any way. Likewise, most of the Sons of Hercules movies shown on American TV in the 1960s had nothing to do with Hercules in their original Italian versions.

(see also The Three Stooges Meet Hercules (1962), an American-made genre parody starring peplum star Samson Burke as Hercules)

Goliath series (1959–1964)
The Italians used Goliath as the superhero protagonist in a series of adventure films (pepla) in the early 1960s. He was a man possessed of amazing strength, although he seemed to be a different person in each film. After the classic Hercules (1958) became a blockbuster sensation in the film industry, a 1959 Steve Reeves film Il terrore dei barbari (Terror of the Barbarians) was re-titled Goliath and the Barbarians in the U.S. The film was so successful at the box office, it inspired Italian filmmakers to do a series of four more films featuring a generic beefcake hero named Goliath, although the films were not related to each other in any way (the 1960 Italian peplum David and Goliath starring Orson Welles was not part of this series, since that movie was just a historical retelling of the Biblical story).

The titles in the Italian Goliath adventure series were as follows: (the first title listed for each film is the film's original Italian title along with its English translation, while the U.S. release title follows in bold type in parentheses)
 Il terrore dei barbari / Terror of the Barbarians (1959) (Goliath and the Barbarians in the U.S.), starring Steve Reeves as Goliath (although he is referred to as "Emiliano" in the original Italian-language version)
 Goliath contro i giganti / Goliath Against the Giants (Goliath Against the Giants) (1960) starring Brad Harris
 Goliath e la schiava ribelle / Goliath and the Rebel Slave (Tyrant of Lydia Against The Son of Hercules) (1963) starring Gordon Scott
 Golia e il cavaliere mascherato / Goliath and the Masked Rider (Hercules and the Masked Rider) (1964) starring Alan Steel (note: Goliath is referred to as "Hercules" in English-dubbed prints)
 Golia alla conquista di Bagdad / Goliath at the Conquest of Baghdad (Goliath at the Conquest of Damascus, 1964) starring Rock Stevens (aka Peter Lupus)

The name Goliath was also inserted into the English titles of three other Italian pepla that were re-titled for U.S. distribution in an attempt to cash in on the Goliath craze, but these films were not originally made as "Goliath movies" in Italy.

Both Goliath and the Vampires (1961) and Goliath and the Sins of Babylon (1963) actually featured the famed Italian folk hero Maciste in the original Italian versions, but American distributors did not feel the name "Maciste" meant anything to American audiences.

Goliath and the Dragon (1960) was originally an Italian Hercules movie called The Revenge of Hercules, but it was re-titled Goliath and the Dragon in the U.S. since at the time Goliath and the Barbarians was breaking box-office records, and the distributors may have thought the name "Hercules" was trademarked by distributor Joseph E. Levine.

Maciste series (1960–1965)

There were a total of 25 Maciste films from the 1960s peplum craze (not counting the two dozen silent Maciste films made in Italy pre-1930). By 1960, seeing how well the two Steve Reeves Hercules films were doing at the box office, Italian producers decided to revive the 1920s silent film character Maciste in a new series of color/sound films. Unlike the other Italian peplum protagonists, Maciste found himself in a variety of time periods ranging from the Ice Age to 16th century Scotland. Maciste was never given an origin, and the source of his mighty powers was never revealed. However, in the first film of the 1960s series, he mentions to another character that the name "Maciste" means "born of the rock" (almost as if he was a god who would just appear out of the earth itself in times of need). One of the 1920s silent Maciste films was actually entitled "The Giant from the Dolomite", hinting that Maciste may be more god than man, which would explain his great strength.
The first title listed for each film is the film's original Italian title along with its English translation, while the U.S. release title follows in bold type in parentheses (note how many times Maciste's name in the Italian title is altered to an entirely different name in the American title):
 Maciste nella valle dei re / Maciste in the Valley of the Kings (Son of Samson, 1960)  Maciste the Mighty,  Maciste the Giant, starring Mark Forest
 Maciste nella terra dei ciclopi / Maciste in the Land of the Cyclops (Atlas in the Land of the Cyclops, 1961) starring Gordon Mitchell
 Maciste contro il vampiro / Maciste Vs. the Vampire (Goliath and the Vampires, 1961) starring Gordon Scott
 Il trionfo di Maciste / The Triumph of Maciste (Triumph of the Son of Hercules, 1961) starring Kirk Morris
 Maciste alla corte del gran khan / Maciste at the Court of the Great Khan (Samson and the Seven Miracles of the World, 1961) starring Gordon Scott
 Maciste, l'uomo più forte del mondo / Maciste, the Strongest Man in the World (Mole Men vs the Son of Hercules, 1961) starring Mark Forest
 Maciste contro Ercole nella valle dei guai / Maciste Against Hercules in the Vale of Woe (Hercules in the Vale of Woe, 1961) starring Kirk Morris as Maciste; this was a satire/spoof featuring the comedy team of Franco and Ciccio
 Totò contro Maciste / Totò vs. Maciste (no American title, 1962) starring Samson Burke; this was a comedy satirizing the peplum genre (part of the Italian "Toto" film series) and was never distributed in the U.S.; it is apparently not even available in English
 Maciste all'inferno / Maciste in Hell (The Witch's Curse, 1962) starring Kirk Morris
 Maciste contro lo sceicco / Maciste Against the Sheik (Samson Against the Sheik, 1962) starring Ed Fury
 Maciste, il gladiatore piu forte del mondo / Maciste, the World's Strongest Gladiator (Colossus of the Arena, 1962) starring Mark Forest
 Maciste contro i mostri / Maciste Against the Monsters (Fire Monsters Against the Son of Hercules, 1962) starring Reg Lewis
 Maciste contro i cacciatori di teste / Maciste Against the Headhunters (Colossus and the Headhunters, 1962) starring Kirk Morris;  Fury of the Headhunters
 Maciste, l'eroe piu grande del mondo / Maciste, the World's Greatest Hero (Goliath and the Sins of Babylon, 1963) starring Mark Forest
 Zorro contro Maciste / Zorro Against Maciste (Samson and the Slave Queen, 1963) starring Alan Steel
 Maciste contro i mongoli / Maciste Against the Mongols (Hercules Against the Mongols, 1963) starring Mark Forest
 Maciste nell'inferno di Gengis Khan / Maciste in Genghis Khan's Hell (Hercules Against the Barbarians, 1963) starring Mark Forest
 Maciste alla corte dello zar / Maciste at the Court of the Czar (Atlas Against The Czar, 1964) starring Kirk Morris ( Samson vs. the Giant King)
 Maciste, gladiatore di Sparta / Maciste, Gladiator of Sparta (Terror of Rome Against the Son of Hercules, 1964) starring Mark Forest
 Maciste nelle miniere de re salomone / Maciste in King Solomon's Mines (Samson in King Solomon's Mines, 1964) starring Reg Park
 Maciste e la regina de Samar / Maciste and the Queen of Samar (Hercules Against the Moon Men, 1964) starring Alan Steel
 La valle dell'eco tonante / Valley of the Thundering Echo (Hercules of the Desert, 1964) starring Kirk Morris,  Desert Raiders,  in France as Maciste and the Women of the Valley
 Ercole, Sansone, Maciste e Ursus: gli invincibili / Hercules, Samson, Maciste and Ursus: The Invincibles (Samson and His Mighty Challenge, 1964) starring Renato Rossini as Maciste ( Combate dei Gigantes or Le Grand Defi)
 Gli invicibili fratelli Maciste / The Invincible Maciste Brothers (The Invincible Brothers Maciste, 1964)  The Invincible Gladiators, starring Richard Lloyd as Maciste
 Maciste il Vendicatore dei Mayas / Maciste, Avenger of the Mayans (has no American title, 1965) (Note:* this Maciste film was made up almost entirely of re-edited stock footage from two older Maciste films, Maciste contro i mostri and Maciste contro i cacciatori di teste, so Maciste switches from Kirk Morris to Reg Lewis in various scenes; this movie is very scarce since it was never distributed in the U.S. and is apparently not even available in English)

In 1973, the Spanish cult film director Jesus Franco directed two low-budget "Maciste films" for French producers: Maciste contre la Reine des Amazones (Maciste vs the Queen of the Amazons) and Les exploits érotiques de Maciste dans l'Atlantide (The Erotic Exploits of Maciste in Atlantis). The films had almost identical casts, both starring Val Davis as Maciste, and appear to have been shot back-to-back. The former was distributed in Italy as a "Karzan" movie (a cheap Tarzan imitation), while the latter film was released only in France with hardcore inserts as Les Gloutonnes ("The Gobblers"). These two films were totally unrelated to the 1960s Italian Maciste series.

Ursus series (1960–1964)

Following Buddy Baer's portrayal of Ursus in the classic 1951 film Quo Vadis, Ursus was used as a superhuman Roman-era character who became the protagonist in a series of Italian adventure films made in the early 1960s.

When the "Hercules" film craze hit in 1959, Italian filmmakers were looking for other muscleman characters similar to Hercules whom they could exploit, resulting in the nine-film Ursus series listed below. Ursus was referred to as a "Son of Hercules" in two of the films when they were dubbed in English (in an attempt to cash in on the then-popular "Hercules" craze), although in the original Italian films, Ursus had no connection to Hercules whatsoever. In the English-dubbed version of one Ursus film (retitled Hercules, Prisoner of Evil), Ursus was actually referred to throughout the entire film as "Hercules".

There were a total of nine Italian films that featured Ursus as the main character, listed below as follows: Italian title / English translation of the Italian title (American release title);
 Ursus / Ursus (Ursus, Son of Hercules, 1960)  Mighty Ursus (United Kingdom), starring Ed Fury
 La Vendetta di Ursus / The Revenge of Ursus (The Vengeance of Ursus, 1961) starring Samson Burke
 Ursus e la Ragazza Tartara / Ursus and the Tartar Girl (Ursus and the Tartar Princess, 1961)  The Tartar Invasion,  The Tartar Girl; starring Joe Robinson, Akim Tamiroff, Yoko Tani; directed by Remigio Del Grosso
 Ursus Nella Valle dei Leoni / Ursus in the Valley of the Lions (Valley of the Lions, 1962) starring Ed Fury; this film revealed the origin story of Ursus
 Ursus il gladiatore ribelle / Ursus the Rebel Gladiator (The Rebel Gladiators, 1962) starring Dan Vadis
 Ursus Nella Terra di Fuoco / Ursus in the Land of Fire (Son of Hercules in the Land of Fire, 1963)  Son of Atlas in the Land of Fire; starring Ed Fury
 Ursus il terrore dei Kirghisi / Ursus, the Terror of the Kirghiz (Hercules, Prisoner of Evil, 1964) starring Reg Park
 Ercole, Sansone, Maciste e Ursus: gli invincibili / Hercules, Samson, Maciste and Ursus: The Invincibles (Samson and His Mighty Challenge, 1964) starring Yan Larvor as Ursus ( Combate dei Gigantes or Le Grand Defi)
 Gli Invincibili Tre / The Invincible Three (Three Avengers, 1964) starring Alan Steel as Ursus

Samson series (1961–1964)
A character named Samson was featured in a series of five Italian peplum films in the 1960s, no doubt inspired by the 1959 re-release of the epic Victor Mature film Samson and Delilah. The character was similar to the Biblical Samson in the third and fifth films only; in the other three, he just appears to be a very strong man (not related at all to the Biblical figure).

The titles are listed as follows: Italian title / its English translation (U.S. release title in parentheses);
 Sansone / Samson (Samson) 1961, starring Brad Harris,  in France as Samson Against Hercules
 Sansone contro i pirati / Samson Against the Pirates (Samson and the Sea Beast) 1963, starring Kirk Morris
 Ercole sfida Sansone / Hercules challenges Samson (Hercules, Samson and Ulysses) 1963, starring Richard Lloyd
 Sansone contro il corsaro nero / Samson Against the Black Pirate (Hercules and the Black Pirate) 1963, starring Alan Steel
 Ercole, Sansone, Maciste e Ursus: gli invincibili / Hercules, Samson, Maciste and Ursus: The Invincibles (Samson and the Mighty Challenge) 1964, starring Nadir Baltimore as Samson ( Samson and His Mighty Challenge, Combate dei Gigantes or Le Grand Défi)

The name Samson was also inserted into the U.S. titles of six other Italian movies when they were dubbed in English for U.S. distribution, although these films actually featured the adventures of the famed Italian folk hero Maciste.

Samson Against the Sheik (1962), Son of Samson (1960), Samson and the Slave Queen (1963), Samson and the Seven Miracles of the World (1961), Samson vs. the Giant King (1964), and Samson in King Solomon's Mines (1964) were all re-titled Maciste movies, because the American distributors did not feel the name Maciste was marketable to U.S. filmgoers.

Samson and the Treasure of the Incas ( Hercules and the Treasure of the Incas) (1965) sounds like a peplum title, but was actually a spaghetti Western.

The Sons of Hercules (TV syndication package)

The Sons of Hercules was a syndicated television show that aired in the United States in the 1960s. The series repackaged 14 randomly chosen Italian peplum films by unifying them with memorable title and end title theme songs and a standard voice-over intro relating the main hero in each film to Hercules any way they could. In some areas, each film was split into two one-hour episodes, so the 14 films were shown as 28 weekly episodes. None of the films were ever theatrically released in the U.S.

The films are not listed in chronological order, since they were not really related to each other in any way. The first title listed below for each film was its American broadcast television title, followed in parentheses by the English translation of its original Italian theatrical title:
 Ursus, Son of Hercules (Ursus) 1961, starring Ed Fury,   Mighty Ursus in England
 Mole Men vs the Son of Hercules (Maciste, the Strongest Man in the World) 1961, starring Mark Forest
 Triumph of the Son of Hercules (The Triumph of Maciste) 1961, starring Kirk Morris
 Fire Monsters Against the Son of Hercules (Maciste vs. the Monsters) 1962, starring Reg Lewis
 Venus Against the Son of Hercules (Mars, God Of War) 1962, starring Roger Browne
 Ulysses Against the Son of Hercules (Ulysses against Hercules) 1962, starring Mike Lane
 Medusa Against the Son of Hercules (Perseus The Invincible) 1962, starring Richard Harrison
 Son of Hercules in the Land of Fire (Ursus In The Land Of Fire) 1963, starring Ed Fury
 Tyrant of Lydia Against The Son of Hercules (Goliath and the Rebel Slave) 1963, starring Gordon Scott
 Messalina Against the Son of Hercules (The Last Gladiator) 1963, starring Richard Harrison
 The Beast of Babylon Against the Son of Hercules (Hero of Babylon) 1963, starring Gordon Scott,  Goliath, King of the Slaves
 Terror of Rome Against the Son of Hercules (Maciste, Gladiator of Sparta) 1964, starring Mark Forest
 Son of Hercules in the Land of Darkness (Hercules the Invincible) 1964, starring Dan Vadis
 Devil of the Desert Against the Son of Hercules (Anthar the Invincible) 1964, starring Kirk Morris, directed by Antonio Margheriti,  The Slave Merchants,  Soraya, Queen of the Desert

Steve Reeves pepla (in chronological order of production)

Steve Reeves appeared in 14 pepla made in Italy from 1958 to 1964, and most of his films are highly regarded examples of the genre. His pepla are listed below in order of production, not in order of release. The U.S. release titles are shown below, followed by the original Italian title and its translation (in parentheses)
 Hercules (1958) (Le fatiche di Ercole / The Labors of Hercules) actually filmed in 1957, released in Italy in 1958, released in the U.S. in 1959
 Hercules Unchained (1959) (Ercole e la regina di Lidia / Hercules and the Queen of Lydia) released in the U.S. in 1960
 Goliath and the Barbarians (1959) (Il terrore dei barbari / Terror of the Barbarians)
 The Giant of Marathon (1959) (La battaglia di Maratona / The Battle of Marathon)
 The Last Days of Pompeii (1959) (Gli ultimi giorni di Pompei / The Last Days of Pompeii)
 The White Warrior (1959) (Hadji Murad il Diavolo Bianco / Hadji Murad, The White Devil) directed by Riccardo Freda
 Morgan, the Pirate (1960) (Morgan, il pirata/ Morgan, the Pirate)
 The Thief of Baghdad (1960) (Il Ladro di Bagdad / The Thief of Baghdad)
 The Trojan Horse (1961) (La guerra di Troia/ The Trojan War)
 Duel of the Titans (1961) (Romolo e Remo / Romulus And Remus)
 The Slave (1962) (Il Figlio di Spartaco / Son of Spartacus)
 The Avenger (1962) (La leggenda di Enea / The Legend Of Aeneas)   The Last Glory of Troy; (this was a sequel to The Trojan Horse)
 Sandokan the Great (1963) (Sandokan, la tigre di Mompracem/ Sandokan, the Tiger of Mompracem) directed by Umberto Lenzi
 Pirates of Malaysia (1964)  Sandokan, the Pirate of Malaysia,  Pirates of the Seven Seas; this was a sequel to Sandokan the Great, directed by Umberto Lenzi

Other (non-series) Italian pepla
There were many 1950s and 1960s Italian pepla that did not feature a major superhero (such as Hercules, Maciste or Samson), and as such they fall into a sort of miscellaneous category. Many were of the Cappa e spada (swashbuckler) variety, though they often feature well-known characters such as Ali Baba, Julius Caesar, Ulysses, Cleopatra, the Three Musketeers, Zorro, Theseus, Perseus, Achilles, Robin Hood, and Sandokan. The first really successful Italian films of this kind were Black Eagle (1946) and Fabiola (1949).
 Adventurer of Tortuga, The (1964), starring Guy Madison
 Adventures of Mandrin, The (1952)  Captain Adventure  Don Juan's Night of Love  The Affair of Madame Pompadour, starring Raf Vallone and Silvana Pampanini,
 Adventures of Scaramouche, The (1963)  The Mask of Scaramouche, starring Gérard Barray and Gianna Maria Canale
 Alexander The Great (1956), starring Richard Burton (U.S. film with music score by Mario Nascimbene)
 Ali Baba and the Sacred Crown (1962)  The Seven Tasks of Ali Baba, starring Richard Lloyd
 Ali Baba and the Seven Saracens (1964)  Sinbad Against the Seven Saracens, starring Gordon Mitchell
 Alone Against Rome (1962)  Vengeance of the Gladiators, starring Lang Jeffries and Rossana Podestà
 Anthar the Invincible (1964)  Devil of the Desert Against the Son of Hercules, starring Kirk Morris, directed by Antonio Margheriti
 Antigone (1961)  Rites for the Dead, starring Irene Papas, a Greek production
 Arena, The (1974)  Naked Warriors, directed by Steve Carver and Joe D'Amato, starring Pam Grier and Margaret Markov (a late entry in the genre)
 Arms of the Avenger (1963)  The Devils of Spartivento/ The Fighting Legions, starring John Drew Barrymore
 Atlas (1961)  Atlas, the Winner of Athena, directed in Greece by Roger Corman, starring Michael Forest
 Attack of the Moors (1959)  The Kings of France
 Attack of the Normans (1962)  The Normans,   The Vikings Attack; starring Cameron Mitchell
 Attila (1954), directed by Pietro Francisci, starring Anthony Quinn and Sophia Loren
 Avenger of the Seven Seas (1961)  Executioner of the Seas, starring Richard Harrison and Michèle Mercier
 Avenger of Venice, The (1963), starring Brett Halsey and Gianna Maria Canale
 Bacchantes, The (1961), starring Pierre Brice and Akim Tamiroff
 Balboa (Spanish, 1963)  Conquistadors of the Pacific
 Barabbas (1961) produced by Dino de Laurentiis, starring Anthony Quinn, filmed in Italy
 Battle of the Amazons (1973)  Amazons: Women of Love and War,  Beauty of the Barbarian (directed by Alfonso Brescia)
 Beatrice Cenci (1956) directed by Riccardo Freda
 Beatrice Cenci (1969) directed by Lucio Fulci
 Behind the Mask of Zorro (1966)  The Oath of Zorro, Tony Russel
 Bible, The (1966) ( La Bibbia), Dino de Laurentiis, Ennio Morricone music, filmed in Italy
 Black Archer, The (1959)
 Black Devil, The (1957) starred Gerard Landry
 Black Duke, The (1963), starring Cameron Mitchell
 Black Eagle, The (1946)  Return of the Black Eagle, directed by Riccardo Freda
 Black Lancers, The (1962)  Charge of the Black Lancers, Mel Ferrer
 Brennus, Enemy of Rome (1964)  Battle of the Valiant, Gordon Mitchell
 Burning of Rome, The (1963)  The Magnificent Adventurer, Brett Halsey
 Caesar Against the Pirates (1962) Gordon Mitchell
 Caesar the Conqueror (1962), starring Cameron Mitchell
 Captain Falcon (1958) Lex Barker
 Captain from Toledo, The (1966)
 Captain of Iron, The (1961)  Revenge of the Mercenaries, Barbara Steele
 Captain Phantom (1953)
 Captains of Adventure (1961) starring Paul Muller, Gerard Landry
 Caribbean Hawk, The (1963) Yvonne Monlaur
 Carthage in Flames (1960)
 Castillian, The (1963) Cesare Romero
 Catherine of Russia (1963) directed by Umberto Lenzi
 Cavalier in the Devil's Castle (1959)
 Centurion, The (1962)  The Conqueror of Corinth
 Challenge of the Gladiator (1965) Peter Lupus
 Cleopatra's Daughter (1960)  The Tomb of the Kings, Debra Paget
 Colossus and the Amazon Queen (1960), Ed Fury and Rod Taylor
 Colossus of Rhodes, The (1960) directed by Sergio Leone
 Conqueror of Atlantis (1965)  The Kingdom in the Sand, Kirk Morris (U.S. dubbed version calls the hero "Hercules")
 Conqueror of Maracaibo, The (1961)
 Conqueror of the Orient (1961) starring Rik Battaglia
 Constantine and the Cross (1960)  Constantine the Great, starring Cornel Wilde
 Coriolanus: Hero without a Country (1963)  Thunder of Battle, Gordon Scott
 Cossacks, The (1959) Edmund Purdom
 The Count of Braggalone (1954) aka The Last Musketeer, starring Georges Marchal
 Count of Monte Cristo, The (1961) Louis Jourdan
 Damon and Pythias (1962)  The Tyrant of Syracuse, Guy Williams
 David and Goliath (1960) Orson Welles
 Defeat of Hannibal, The (1937)  Scipione l'Africano
 Defeat of the Barbarians (1962)  King Manfred
 Desert Desperadoes (1959) Akim Tamiroff
 Desert Warrior (1957)  The Desert Lovers, Ricardo Montalban
 Devil Made a Woman, The (1959)  A Girl Against Napoleon
 Devil's Cavaliers, The (1959)
 Diary of a Roman Virgin (1974)  Livia, una vergine per l'impero romano, directed by Joe D'Amato (used stock footage from The Last Days of Pompeii (1959) and The Arena (1974))
 Dragon's Blood, The (1957)  Sigfrido, based on the legend of the Niebelungen, special effects by Carlo Rambaldi
 Duel of Champions (1961)  Horatio and Curiazi, Alan Ladd
 Erik the Conqueror (1961)  Gli Invasori/ The Invaders, directed by Mario Bava, starring Cameron Mitchell
 Esther and the King (1961) Joan Collins, Richard Egan
 Executioner of Venice, The (1963) Lex Barker, Guy Madison
 Fabiola (1949)  The Fighting Gladiator
 Falcon of the Desert (1965)  The Magnificent Challenge, starring Kirk Morris
 Fall of Rome, The (1961) directed by Antonio Margheriti
 Fall of the Roman Empire, The (1964) U.S. production filmed in Spain, Sophia Loren
 Fighting Musketeers, The (1961)
 Fire Over Rome (1963)
 Fury of Achilles, The (1962) Gordon Mitchell
 Fury of the Pagans (1960)  Fury of the Barbarians
 Giant of Metropolis, The (1961) Gordon Mitchell (this peplum had a science fiction theme instead of fantasy)
 Giant of the Evil Island (1965)  Mystery of the Cursed Island, Peter Lupus
 Giants of Rome (1964) directed by Antonio Margheriti, starring Richard Harrison
 Giants of Thessaly (1960) directed by Riccardo Freda
 Gladiator of Rome (1962)  Battle of the Gladiators, Gordon Scott
 Gladiators Seven (1962)  The Seven Gladiators, Richard Harrison
 Golden Arrow, The (1962) directed by Antonio Margheriti
 Gold for the Caesars (1963) Jeffrey Hunter
 Golgotha (1935)  Behold the Man (made in France)
 Guns of the Black Witch (1961)  Terror of the Sea, Don Megowan
 Hannibal (1959) Victor Mature
 Hawk of the Caribbean (1963)  The Caribbean Hawk
 Head of a Tyrant (1959)  Judith and Holophernes
 Helen of Troy (1956) starring Jacques Sernas
 Hero of Babylon (1963)  The Beast of Babylon vs. the Son of Hercules, Gordon Scott
 Hero of Rome (1964)  The Colossus of Rome, Gordon Scott
 Herod the Great (1958)
 Huns, The (1960)  Queen of the Tartars
 Invasion 1700 (1962)  With Iron and Fire,  With Fire and Sword,  Daggers of Blood
 Ivanhoe, the Norman Swordsman (1971)  La spada normanna, directed by Roberto Mauri
 Invincible Gladiator, The (1961) Richard Harrison
 Invincible Swordsman, The (1963)
 The Iron Swordsman (1949)  Count Ugolino, directed by Riccardo Freda
 Jacob, The Man Who Fought With God (1963)
 Kampf um Rom (1968)  The Last Roman, starring Laurence Harvey, Honor Blackman, Orson Welles
 Kindar, the Invulnerable (1965) Mark Forest
 King of the Vikings (1960)  Prince in Chains, The
 Knight of a Hundred Faces, The (1960)  The Silver Knight,  Knight of a Thousand Faces, The, starring Lex Barker
 Knights of Terror (1963)  Terror of the Red Capes, Tony Russel
 Knight Without a Country (1959)  The Faceless Rider
 Knives of the Avenger (1967)  Viking Massacre, directed by Mario Bava, starring Cameron Mitchell
 Last Gladiator, The (1963)  Messalina Against the Son of Hercules
 Last of the Vikings (1961), starring Cameron Mitchell
 Legions of the Nile (1959)  The Legions of Cleopatra
 Lion of St. Mark, The (1964) Gordon Scott
 Lion of Thebes, The (1964)  Helen of Troy, Mark Forest
 Loves of Salammbo, The (1960)  Salambo
 Magnificent Gladiator, The (1964) Mark Forest
 Marco Polo (1962) Rory Calhoun
 Marco the Magnificent (1965) Anthony Quinn, Orson Welles
 Mars, God of War (1962)  Venus Against the Son of Hercules
 Masked Conqueror, The (1962)
 Masked Man Against the Pirates, The (1965)
 Mask of the Musketeers (1963)  Zorro and the Three Musketeers, starring Gordon Scott
 Massacre in the Black Forest (1967), starring Cameron Mitchell
 Messalina (1960) Belinda Lee
 Michael Strogoff (1956)  Revolt of the Tartars
 Mighty Crusaders, The (1958)  Jerusalem Set Free, Gianna Maria Canale
 Minotaur, The (1960)  Theseus Against the Minotaur,  The Warlord of Crete
 Miracle of the Wolves (1961)  Blood on his Sword, starring Jean Marais
 Missione sabbie roventi (Mission Burning Sands) (1966) starring Renato Rossini, directed by Alfonso Brescia
 Mongols, The (1961) directed by Riccardo Freda, starring Jack Palance
 Moses the Lawgiver (1973) aka Moses in Egypt, starring Burt Lancaster, Anthony Quayle (6-hour made-for-TV Italian/British co-production) also released theatrically
 Musketeers of the Sea (1962)
 My Son, The Hero (1961)  Arrivano i Titani,  The Titans
 Mysterious Rider, The (1948) directed by Riccardo Freda
 Mysterious Swordsman, The (1956) starring Gerard Landry
 Nero and the Burning of Rome (1953)  Nero and Messalina
 Night of the Great Attack (1961)  Revenge of the Borgias
 Night They Killed Rasputin, The (1960)  The Last Czar
 Nights of Lucretia Borgia, The (1959)
 Odyssey, The (1968)  L'Odissea, Cyclops segment directed by Mario Bava; Samson Burke played Polyphemus the Cyclops
 Old Testament, The (1962) starred Brad Harris
 Perseus the Invincible (1962)  Medusa vs. the Son of Hercules
 Pharaoh's Woman, The (1960)
 Pia of Ptolomey (1962)
 Pirate and the Slave Girl, The (1959)  Scimitar of the Saracen, Lex Barker
 Pirate of the Black Hawk, The (1958) Gérard Landry
 Pirate of the Half Moon (1957)
 Pirates of the Coast (1960) Lex Barker
 Pontius Pilate (1962) Basil Rathbone
 Prince with the Red Mask, The (1955)  The Red Eagle, starring Frank Latimore
 Prisoner of the Iron Mask, The (1962)  The Revenge of the Iron Mask
 Pugni, Pirati e Karatè (1973)  Fists, Pirates and Karate, directed by Joe D'Amato, starring Richard Harrison (a 1970s Italian spoof of pirate movies)
 Queen for Caesar, A (1962) Gordon Scott
 Queen of Sheba (1952) directed by Pietro Francisci
 Queen of the Amazons (1960)  Colossus and the Amazon Queen
 Queen of the Nile (1961)  Nefertiti, Vincent Price
 Queen of the Pirates (1960)  The Venus of the Pirates, Gianna Maria Canale
 Queen of the Seas (1961) directed by Umberto Lenzi
 Quo Vadis (1951) filmed in Italy, Sergio Leone asst. dir.
 Rage of the Buccaneers (1961)  Gordon, The Black Pirate, starring Vincent Price
 Rape of the Sabine Women, The (1961)  Romulus and the Sabines, Roger Moore
 Red Cloak, The (1955) Bruce Cabot
 Red Sheik, The (1962)
 Revak the Rebel (1960)  The Barbarians, Jack Palance
 Revenge of Black Eagle, The (1951) Gianna Maria Canale
 Revenge of Ivanhoe, The (1965) Rik Battaglia
 Revenge of Spartacus, The (1965)  Revenge of the Gladiators, Roger Browne
 Revenge of the Barbarians (1960)
 Revenge of the Black Eagle (1951) directed by Riccardo Freda
 Revenge of the Conquered (1961)  Drakut the Avenger
 Revenge of the Gladiators (1961) starring Mickey Hargitay
 Revenge of the Musketeers (1964)  Dartagnan vs. the Three Musketeers, starring Fernando Lamas
 Revolt of the Barbarians (1964) directed by Guido Malatesta
 Revolt of the Mercenaries (1961)
 Revolt of the Praetorians (1964)  The Invincible Warriors, starring Richard Harrison
 Revolt of the Seven (1964)  The Spartan Gladiator, starring Helga Line
 Revolt of the Slaves, The (1960) Rhonda Fleming
 Robin Hood and the Pirates (1960) Lex Barker
 Roland the Mighty (1956)  Orlando, directed by Pietro Francisci
 Rome Against Rome (1964)  War of the Zombies
 Rome 1585 (1961)  The Mercenaries, Debra Paget
 Rover, The (1967)  The Adventurer, starring Anthony Quinn
 Sack of Rome, The (1953)  The Barbarians,  The Pagans
 Samson and Gideon (1965) Fernando Rey, Biblical film
 Sandokan Fights Back (1964)  Sandokan to the Rescue,  The Revenge of Sandokan
 Sandokan vs. the Leopard of Sarawak (1964)  Throne of Vengeance
 Saracens, The (1965)  The Devil's Pirate,  The Flag of Death, starring Richard Harrison
 Saul and David (1964)
 Scheherazade (1963) starring Anna Karina
 Sea Pirate, The (1966)  Thunder Over the Indian Ocean,  Surcouf, Hero of the Seven Seas
 Secret Mark of D'Artagnan, The (1962)
 Secret Seven, The (1965)  The Invincible Seven
 Seven from Thebes (1964)
 Seven Rebel Gladiators (1965)  Seven Against All, starring Roger Browne
 Seven Revenges, The (1961)  The Seven Challenges,  Ivan the Conqueror, starring Ed Fury
 Seven Seas to Calais (1962)  Sir Francis Drake, King of the Seven Seas, Rod Taylor
 Seven Slaves Against the World (1964)  Seven Slaves Against Rome, starring Roger Browne and Gordon Mitchell
 Seven Tasks of Ali Baba, The (1962)  Ali Baba and the Sacred Crown
 Seventh Sword, The (1962) Brett Halsey
 79 A.D., the Destruction of Herculaneum (1962) Brad Harris
 Shadow of Zorro, The (1962)
 Sheba and the Gladiator (1959)  The Sign of Rome,  Sign of the Gladiator, Anita Ekberg
 Siege of Syracuse (1960) Tina Louise
 Simbad e il califfo di Bagdad (1973) directed by Pietro Francisci
 Sins of Rome (1953)  Spartacus, directed by Riccardo Freda
 Slave Girls of Sheba (1963) starring Linda Cristal
 Slave of Rome (1960) starring Guy Madison
 Slave Queen of Babylon (1963) Yvonne Furneaux
 Slaves of Carthage, The (1956)  The Sword and the Cross, Gianna Maria Canale (not to be confused with Mary Magdalene; see below)
 Sodom and Gomorrah (1962) Rosanna Podesta, U.S./Italian film shot in Italy, co-directed by Sergio Leone
 Son of Black Eagle (1968)
 Son of Captain Blood, The (1962)
 Son of Cleopatra, The (1965) Mark Damon
 Son of d'Artagnan (1950) directed by Riccardo Freda
 Son of El Cid, The (1965)  100 Horsemen, Mark Damon
 Son of the Red Corsair (1959) a.k.a. Son of the Red Pirate, Lex Barker
 Son of the Sheik (1961)  Kerim, Son of the Sheik, starring Gordon Scott
 Spartacus and the Ten Gladiators (1964)  Ten Invincible Gladiators, starring Dan Vadis
 Spartan Gladiator, The (1965) Tony Russel
 Story of Joseph and his Brethren, The (1961)
 Suleiman the Conqueror (1961)
 Sword and the Cross, The (1958)  Mary Magdalene
 Sword in the Shadow, A (1961) starring Livio Lorenzon
 Sword of Damascus, The (1964)  The Thief of Damascus
 Sword of El Cid, The (1962)  The Daughters of El Cid
 Sword of Islam, The (1961)
 Sword of the Conqueror (1961)  Rosamund and Alboino, Jack Palance
 Sword for the Empire, A (1965)  Sword of the Empire
 Sword of the Rebellion, The (1964)  The Rebel of Castelmonte
 Swordsman of Siena (1962)  The Mercenary
 Sword of Vengeance (1961)  La spada della vendetta
 Sword Without a Country (1961)  Sword Without a Flag
 Tartars, The (1961) starring Victor Mature
 Taras Bulba, The Cossack (1963)  Plains of Battle
 Taur, the Mighty (1963)  Tor the Warrior,  Taur, the King of Brute Force, starring Joe Robinson
 Temple of the White Elephant (1965)  Sandok, the Giant of the Jungle,  Sandok, the Maciste of the Jungle (not a Maciste film, however, in spite of the alternate title)
 Ten Gladiators, The (1963) starring Dan Vadis
 Terror of the Black Mask (1963)  The Invincible Masked Rider
 Terror of the Red Mask (1960) starring Lex Barker
 Terror of the Steppes (1964)  The Mighty Khan, Kirk Morris
 Tharus, Son of Attila (1962)  Colossus and the Huns, Ricardo Montalban
 Theodora, Slave Empress (1954) directed by Riccardo Freda
 Thor and the Amazon Women (1963) starring Joe Robinson
 Three Hundred Spartans, The (1963) starring Richard Egan; U.S. film filmed in Greece using Italian screenwriters
 Three Swords for Rome (1965) starring Roger Browne
 Three Swords of Zorro, The (1963)
 Tiger of the Seven Seas (1962)
 Treasure of the Petrified Forest, The (1965) starring Gordon Mitchell
 Triumph of Robin Hood (1962) starring Samson Burke
 Triumph of the Ten Gladiators (1965) starring Dan Vadis
 Two Gladiators, The (1964)  Fight or Die, starring Richard Harrison
 Tyrant of Castile, The (1964) starring Mark Damon
 Ulysses (1954) produced by Dino De Laurentiis, starring Kirk Douglas and Anthony Quinn
 Virgins of Rome, The (1961)  Amazons of Rome
 Vulcan, Son of Jupiter (1962)  Vulcan, Son of Jove, Gordon Mitchell, Richard Lloyd, Roger Browne
 War Goddess (1973)  The Bare-Breasted Warriors,  Le guerriere dal seno nudo, directed by Terence Young
 War Gods of Babylon (1962)  The Seventh Thunderbolt,  The Seven Glories of Assur
 Warrior and the Slave Girl, The (1958)  The Revolt of the Gladiators, starring Gianna Maria Canale
 Warrior Empress, The (1960)  Sappho, Venus of Lesbos, Kerwin Mathews, Tina Louise
 White Slave Ship (1961) directed by Silvio Amadio
 Women of Devil's Island (1962) starring Guy Madison
 Wonders of Aladdin, The (1961) starring Donald O'Connor
 Zorikan the Barbarian (1964) starring Dan Vadis
 Zorro (1975) Alain Delon
 Zorro and the Three Musketeers (1963)  Mask of the Musketeers, starring Gordon Scott
 Zorro in the Court of England (1970) starring Spiros Focás
 Zorro at the Court of Spain (1962)  The Masked Conqueror, George Ardisson
 Zorro of Monterrey (1971)  El Zorro de Monterrey, Carlos Quiney
 Zorro, Rider of Vengeance (1971) Carlos Quiney
 Zorro's Last Adventure (1970)  La última aventura del Zorro, Carlos Quiney
 Zorro the Avenger (1962)  The Revenge of Zorro, Frank Latimore
 Zorro the Avenger (1969)  El Zorro justiciero (1969) starring Fabio Testi
 Zorro the Fox (1968)  El Zorro, George Ardisson
 Zorro, the Navarra Marquis (1969) Nino Vingelli
 Zorro the Rebel (1966) Howard Ross
 Zorro Against Maciste (1963)  Samson and the Slave Queen (1963) starring Pierre Brice, Alan Steel

Gladiator films
Inspired by the success of Spartacus, there were a number of Italian peplums that heavily emphasized the gladiatorial arena in their plots, with it becoming almost a peplum subgenre in itself. One group of supermen known as "The Ten Gladiators" appeared in a trilogy, all three films starring Dan Vadis in the lead role.
 Alone Against Rome (1962)  Vengeance of the Gladiators
 The Arena (1974)  Naked Warriors, co-directed by Joe D'Amato, starring Pam Grier, Paul Muller and Rosalba Neri
 Challenge of the Gladiator (1965) starring Peter Lupus ( Rock Stevens)
 Fabiola (1949)  The Fighting Gladiator
 Gladiator of Rome (1962)  Battle of the Gladiators, starring Gordon Scott
 Gladiators Seven (1962)  The Seven Gladiators, starring Richard Harrison
 Invincible Gladiator, The (1961) Richard Harrison
 Last Gladiator, The (1963)  Messalina Against the Son of Hercules
 Maciste, Gladiator of Sparta (1964)  Terror of Rome Against the Son of Hercules
 Revenge of Spartacus, The (1965)  Revenge of the Gladiators, starring Roger Browne
 Revenge of The Gladiators (1961) starring Mickey Hargitay
 Revolt of the Seven (1964)  The Spartan Gladiator, starring Tony Russel and Helga Line
 Revolt of the Slaves (1961) Rhonda Fleming
 Seven Rebel Gladiators (1965)  Seven Against All, starring Roger Browne
 Seven Slaves Against the World (1965)  Seven Slaves Against Rome,  The Strongest Slaves in the World, starring Roger Browne and Gordon Mitchell
 Sheba and the Gladiator (1959)  The Sign of Rome,  Sign of the Gladiator, Anita Ekberg
 Sins of Rome (1952)  Spartacus, directed by Riccardo Freda
 Slave, The (1962)  Son of Spartacus, Steve Reeves
 Spartacus and the Ten Gladiators (1964)  Ten Invincible Gladiators, Dan Vadis
 Spartan Gladiator, The (1965) Tony Russel
 Ten Gladiators, The (1963) Dan Vadis
 Triumph of the Ten Gladiators (1965) Dan Vadis
 Two Gladiators, The (1964)  Fight or Die, Richard Harrison
 Ursus, the Rebel Gladiator (1963)  Rebel Gladiators, Dan Vadis
 Warrior and the Slave Girl, The (1958)  The Revolt of the Gladiators, Gianna Maria Canale

Ancient Rome
 Brennus, Enemy of Rome (1964)  Battle of the Valiant, Gordon Mitchell
 Caesar Against the Pirates (1962) Gordon Mitchell
 Caesar the Conqueror (1962) Cameron Mitchell, Rik Battaglia
 Carthage in Flames (1960)  Cartagine in fiamme, directed by Carmine Gallone
 Centurion The (1962)  The Conqueror of Corinth
 Colossus of Rhodes, The (1960) directed by Sergio Leone
 Constantine and the Cross (1960)  Constantine the Great
 Coriolanus: Hero without a Country (1963)  Thunder of Battle, Gordon Scott
 Diary of a Roman Virgin (1974)  Livia, una vergine per l'impero romano, directed by Joe D'Amato (used stock footage from The Last Days of Pompeii (1959) and The Arena (1974))
 Duel of Champions (1961)  Horatio and Curiazi, Alan Ladd
 Duel of the Titans (1962)  Romulus and Remus, Steve Reeves, Gordon Scott
 Fall of Rome, The (1961) directed by Antonio Margheriti
 Fire Over Rome (1963)
 Giants of Rome (1963) directed by Antonio Margheriti, starring Richard Harrison
 Gold for the Caesars (1963) Jeffrey Hunter
 Hannibal (1959) Victor Mature
 Hero of Rome (1964)  The Colossus of Rome, Gordon Scott
 Kampf um Rom (1968)  The Last Roman, starring Laurence Harvey, Honor Blackman, Orson Welles
 Last Days of Pompeii (1959) Steve Reeves
 Massacre in the Black Forest (1967) Cameron Mitchell
 Messalina (1960)
 Nero and the Burning of Rome (1955)  Nero and Messalina
 Quo Vadis (1951) assistant director Sergio Leone
 Rape of the Sabine Women, The (1961) Roger Moore
 Revenge of Spartacus, The (1965) Roger Browne
 Revenge of the Barbarians (1960)
 Revolt of the Praetorians (1965) Richard Harrison
 Rome Against Rome (1963)  War of the Zombies
 The Secret Seven (1965)  The Invincible Seven
 79 A.D., the Destruction of Herculaneum (1962) Brad Harris
 Sheba and the Gladiator (1959)  The Sign of Rome,  Sign of the Gladiator, Anita Ekberg
 Sins of Rome (1952)  Spartaco, directed by Riccardo Freda
 The Slave of Rome (1960) starring Guy Madison
 Slaves of Carthage, The (1956)  The Sword and the Cross, Gianna Maria Canale (not to be confused with Mary Magdalene)
 Theodora, Slave Empress (1954) directed by Riccardo Freda
 Three Swords for Rome (1965) Roger Browne
 Virgins of Rome, The (1961)  Amazons of Rome

Greek mythology
 The Avenger (1962)  Legend of Aeneas, Steve Reeves
 Alexander The Great (1956) U.S. film with music score by Mario Nascimbene
 Antigone (1961)  Rites for the Dead, a Greek production
 Bacchantes, The (1961)
 Battle of the Amazons (1973)  Amazons: Women of Love and War,  Beauty of the Barbarian (directed by Alfonso Brescia)
 The Colossus of Rhodes (1961) directed by Sergio Leone
 Conqueror of Atlantis (1965) starring Kirk Morris
 Damon and Pythias (1962) Guy Williams
 Fury of Achilles (1962) Gordon Mitchell
 Giant of Marathon (1959) (The Battle of Marathon) Steve Reeves
 Giants of Thessaly (1960) directed by Riccardo Freda
 Helen of Troy (1956) directed by Robert Wise
 Hercules Challenges Samson (1963)  Hercules, Samson and Ulysses
 Lion of Thebes, The (1964)  Helen of Troy, Mark Forest
 Mars, God of War (1962)  Venus Against the Son of Hercules
 The Minotaur (1961)  Theseus Against the Minotaur,  The Warlord of Crete
 My Son, the Hero (1961)  Arrivano i Titani,  The Titans
 Odyssey, The (1968) Cyclops segment directed by Mario Bava; Samson Burke played Polyphemus the Cyclops
 Perseus the Invincible (1962)  Medusa vs. the Son of Hercules
 Queen of the Amazons (1960)  Colossus and the Amazon Queen
 Seven from Thebes (1964) André Lawrence
 Siege of Syracuse, The (1962) Tina Louise
 Treasure of the Petrified Forest (1965) Gordon Mitchell (the plot involves Amazons)
 Trojan Horse, The (1961)  The Trojan War, Steve Reeves
 Ulysses (1954) starring Kirk Douglas and Anthony Quinn
 Vulcan, Son of Jupiter (1962)  Vulcan, Son of Jove, Gordon Mitchell, Richard Lloyd, Roger Browne
 Warrior Empress, The (1960)  Sappho, Venus of Lesbos, Kerwin Mathews, Tina Louise

Barbarian and Viking films
 Attack of the Normans (1962)  The Normans, Cameron Mitchell
 Attila (1954) directed by Pietro Francisci, Anthony Quinn, Sophia Loren
 The Cossacks (1960)
 Defeat of the Barbarians (1962)  King Manfred
 Dragon's Blood, The (1957)  Sigfrido, based on the legend of the Niebelungen, special effects by Carlo Rambaldi
 Erik the Conqueror (1961)  The Invaders, directed by Mario Bava, starring Cameron Mitchell
 Fury of the Pagans (1960)  Fury of the Barbarians
 Goliath and the Barbarians (1959)  Terror of the Barbarians, Steve Reeves
 The Huns (1960)  Queen of the Tartars
 Invasion 1700 (1962)  With Iron and Fire,  With Fire and Sword,  Daggers of Blood
 King of the Vikings (1960)  The Prince in Chains
 The Last of the Vikings (1961) starring Cameron Mitchell and Broderick Crawford
 Marco Polo (1962) Rory Calhoun
 Marco the Magnificent (1965) Anthony Quinn, Orson Welles
 Michel Strogoff (1956)  Revolt of the Tartars
 The Mongols (1961) starring Jack Palance
 Revak the Rebel (1960)  The Barbarians, Jack Palance
 Revolt of the Barbarians (1964) directed by Guido Malatesta
 Roland the Mighty (1956) directed by Pietro Francisci
 Saracens, The (1965)  The Devil's Pirate,  The Flag of Death
 The Seven Revenges (1961)  The Seven Challenges,  Ivan the Conqueror, starring Ed Fury
 Suleiman the Conqueror (1961)
 Sword of the Conqueror (1961)  Rosamund and Alboino, Jack Palance
 Sword of the Empire (1964)
 Taras Bulba, The Cossack (1963)  Plains of Battle
 The Tartars (1961) Victor Mature, Orson Welles
 Terror of the Steppes (1963)  The Mighty Khan, starring Kirk Morris
 Tharus Son of Attila (1962)  Colossus and the Huns, Ricardo Montalban
 Zorikan the Barbarian (1964) Dan Vadis

Swashbucklers / pirates
 Adventurer of Tortuga (1965) starring Guy Madison
 Adventures of Mandrin, The (1960)  Captain Adventure
 Adventures of Scaramouche, The (1963)  The Mask of Scaramouche, Gianna Maria Canale
 Arms of the Avenger (1963)  The Devils of Spartivento, starring John Drew Barrymore
 At Sword's Edge (1952) dir. by Carlo Ludovico Bragaglia
 Attack of the Moors (1959)  The Kings of France
 Avenger of the Seven Seas (1961)  Executioner of the Seas, Richard Harrison
 Avenger of Venice, The (1963) directed by Riccardo Freda, starring Brett Halsey
 Balboa (Spanish, 1963)  Conquistadors of the Pacific
 Beatrice Cenci (1956) directed by Riccardo Freda
 Beatrice Cenci (1969) directed by Lucio Fulci
 Behind the Mask of Zorro (1966)  The Oath of Zorro, Tony Russel
 Black Archer, The (1959) Gerard Landry
 Black Devil, The (1957) Gerard Landry
 Black Duke, The (1963) Cameron Mitchell
 Black Eagle, The (1946)  Return of the Black Eagle, directed by Riccardo Freda
 Black Lancers, The (1962)  Charge of the Black Lancers, Mel Ferrer
 Captain from Toledo, The (1966)
 Captain of Iron, The (1962)  Revenge of the Mercenaries, Barbara Steele
 Captain Phantom (1953)
 Captains of Adventure (1961) starring Paul Muller and Gerard Landry
 Caribbean Hawk, The (1963) Yvonne Monlaur
 Castillian, The (1963) Cesare Romero, U.S./Spanish co-production
 Catherine of Russia (1962) directed by Umberto Lenzi
 Cavalier in Devil's Castle (1959)  Cavalier of Devil's Island
 Conqueror of Maracaibo, The (1961)
 The Count of Braggalone (1954) aka The Last Musketeer, starring Georges Marchal
 Count of Monte Cristo, The (1962) Louis Jourdan
 Devil Made a Woman, The (1959)  A Girl Against Napoleon
 Devil's Cavaliers, The (1959)  The Devil's Riders, Gianna Maria Canale
 Dick Turpin (1974) a Spanish production
 El Cid (1961) Sophia Loren, Charlton Heston, U.S./ Italian film shot in Italy
 Executioner of Venice, The (1963) Lex Barker, Guy Madison
 Fighting Musketeers, The (1961)
 Giant of the Evil Island (1965)  Mystery of the Cursed Island, Peter Lupus
 Goliath and the Masked Rider (1964)  Hercules and the Masked Rider, Alan Steel
 Guns of the Black Witch (1961)  Terror of the Sea, Don Megowan
 Hawk of the Caribbean (1963)
 Invincible Swordsman, The (1963)
 The Iron Swordsman (1949)  Count Ugolino, directed by Riccardo Freda
 Ivanhoe, the Norman Swordsman (1971)  La spada normanna, directed by Roberto Mauri
 Knight of a Hundred Faces, The (1960)  The Silver Knight, starring Lex Barker
 Knights of Terror (1963)  Terror of the Red Capes, Tony Russel
 Knight Without a Country (1959)  The Faceless Rider
 Lawless Mountain, The (1953)  La montaña sin ley (stars Zorro)
 Lion of St. Mark, The (1964) Gordon Scott
 Mark of Zorro (1975) made in France, Monica Swinn
 Mark of Zorro (1976) George Hilton
 Masked Conqueror, The (1962)
 Mask of the Musketeers (1963)  Zorro and the Three Musketeers, starring Gordon Scott
 Michael Strogoff (1956)  Revolt of the Tartars
 Miracle of the Wolves (1961)  Blood on his Sword, starring Jean Marais
 Morgan, the Pirate (1960) Steve Reeves
 Musketeers of the Sea (1960)
 Mysterious Rider, The (1948) directed by Riccardo Freda
 Mysterious Swordsman, The (1956) starred Gerard Landry
 Nephews of Zorro, The (1968) Italian comedy with Franco and Ciccio
 Night of the Great Attack (1961)  Revenge of the Borgias
 Night They Killed Rasputin, The (1960)  The Last Czar
 Nights of Lucretia Borgia, The (1959)
 Pirate and the Slave Girl, The (1959) Lex Barker
 Pirate of the Black Hawk, The (1958)
 Pirate of the Half Moon (1957)
 Pirates of the Coast (1960) Lex Barker
 Prince with the Red Mask, The (1955)  The Red Eagle
 Prisoner of the Iron Mask, The (1961)  The Revenge of the Iron Mask
 Pugni, Pirati e Karatè (1973)  Fists, Pirates and Karate, directed by Joe D'Amato, starring Richard Harrison (a 1970s Italian spoof of pirate movies)
 Queen of the Pirates (1961)  The Venus of the Pirates, Gianna Maria Canale
 Queen of the Seas (1961) directed by Umberto Lenzi
 Rage of the Buccaneers (1961)  Gordon, The Black Pirate, starring Vincent Price
 Red Cloak, The (1955) Bruce Cabot
 Revenge of Ivanhoe, The (1965) Rik Battaglia
 Revenge of the Black Eagle (1951) directed by Riccardo Freda
 Revenge of the Musketeers (1963)  Dartagnan vs. the Three Musketeers, Fernando Lamas
 Revenge of Spartacus, The (1965) Roger Browne
 Revolt of the Mercenaries (1961)
 Robin Hood and the Pirates (1960) Lex Barker
 Roland, the Mighty (1956) directed by Pietro Francisci
 Rome 1585 (1961)  The Mercenaries, Debra Paget, set in the 1500s
 Rover, The (1967)  The Adventurer, starring Anthony Quinn
 The Sack of Rome (1953)  The Barbarians,  The Pagans (set in the 1500s)
 Samson vs. the Black Pirate (1963)  Hercules and the Black Pirate, Alan Steel
 Samson vs. the Pirates (1963)  Samson and the Sea Beast, Kirk Morris
 Sandokan Fights Back (1964)  Sandokan to the Rescue,  The Revenge of Sandokan, Guy Madison
 Sandokan the Great (1964)  Sandokan, the Tiger of Mompracem, Steve Reeves
 Sandokan, the Pirate of Malaysia (1964)  Pirates of Malaysia,  Pirates of the Seven Seas, Steve Reeves, directed by Umberto Lenzi
 Sandokan vs. the Leopard of Sarawak (1964)  Throne of Vengeance, Guy Madison
 Saracens, The (1965)  The Devil's Pirate,  The Flag of Death, starring Richard Harrison
 Sea Pirate, The (1966)  Thunder Over the Indian Ocean,  Surcouf, Hero of the Seven Seas
 Secret Mark of D'artagnan, The (1962)
 Seven Seas to Calais (1961)  Sir Francis Drake, King of the Seven Seas, Rod Taylor
 Seventh Sword, The (1960) Brett Halsey
 Shadow of Zorro (1962) Frank Latimore
 Sign of Zorro, The (1952)
  (1963)  Duel at the Rio Grande, Sean Flynn
 Son of Black Eagle (1968)
 Son of Captain Blood (1962)
 Son of d'Artagnan (1950) directed by Riccardo Freda
 Son of El Cid, The (1965) Mark Damon
 Son of the Red Corsair (1959)  Son of the Red Pirate, Lex Barker
 Son of Zorro (1973) Alberto Dell'Acqua
 Sword in the Shadow, A (1961) starring Livio Lorenzon
 Sword of Rebellion, The (1964)  The Rebel of Castelmonte
 Sword of Vengeance (1961)  La spada della vendetta
 Swordsman of Siena, The (1961)  The Mercenary
 Sword Without a Country (1960)  Sword Without a Flag
 Taras Bulba, The Cossack (1963)  Plains of Battle
 Terror of the Black Mask (1963)  The Invincible Masked Rider
 Terror of the Red Mask (1960) Lex Barker
 Three Swords of Zorro, The (1963)  The Sword of Zorro, Guy Stockwell
 Tiger of the Seven Seas (1963)
 Triumph of Robin Hood (1962) starring Samson Burke
 Tyrant of Castile, The (1964) Mark Damon
 White Slave Ship (1961) directed by Silvio Amadio
 The White Warrior (1959)  Hadji Murad, the White Devil, Steve Reeves
 Women of Devil's Island (1962) starring Guy Madison
 Zorro (1968)  El Zorro,  Zorro the Fox, George Ardisson
 Zorro (1975) Alain Delon
 Zorro and the Three Musketeers (1963) Gordon Scott
 Zorro at the Court of England (1969) Spiros Focás as Zorro
 Zorro at the Court of Spain (1962)  The Masked Conqueror, Georgio Ardisson
 Zorro of Monterrey (1971)  El Zorro de Monterrey, Carlos Quiney
 Zorro, Rider of Vengeance (1971) Carlos Quiney
 Zorro's Last Adventure (1970)  La última aventura del Zorro, Carlos Quiney
 Zorro the Avenger (1962)  The Revenge of Zorro, Frank Latimore
 Zorro the Avenger (1969)  El Zorro justiciero (1969) Fabio Testi
 Zorro, the Navarra Marquis (1969) Nadir Moretti as Zorro
 Zorro the Rebel (1966) Howard Ross
 Zorro Against Maciste (1963)  Samson and the Slave Queen (1963) starring Pierre Brice, Alan Steel

Biblical
 Barabbas (1961) Dino de Laurentiis, Anthony Quinn, filmed in Italy
 Bible, The (1966) Dino de Laurentiis, John Huston, filmed in Italy
 David and Goliath (1960) Orson Welles
 Desert Desperadoes (1956) plot involves King Herod
 Esther and the King (1961) Joan Collins, Richard Egan
 Head of a Tyrant, The (1959)
 Herod the Great (1958) Edmund Purdom
 Jacob, the Man Who Fought with God (1964) Giorgio Cerioni
 Mighty Crusaders, The (1957)  Jerusalem Set Free, Gianna Maria Canale
 Moses the Lawgiver (1973) aka Moses in Egypt, Burt Lancaster, Anthony Quayle (6-hour made-for-TV Italian/British co-production) also released theatrically
 Old Testament, The (1962) Brad Harris
 Pontius Pilate (1962) Jean Marais
 The Queen of Sheba (1952), directed by Pietro Francisci
 Samson and Gideon (1965) Fernando Rey
 Saul and David (1963) Gianni Garko
 Sodom and Gomorrah (1962) Rosanna Podesta, U.S./Italian film shot in Italy
 Story of Joseph and his Brethren, The (1960)
 Sword and the Cross, The (1958)  Mary Magdalene, Gianna Maria Canale

Ancient Egypt
 Cleopatra's Daughter (1960) starring Debra Paget
 Legions of the Nile (1959) starring Linda Cristal
 Pharaoh's Woman, The (1960) with John Drew Barrymore
 Queen for Caesar, A (1962) Gordon Scott
 Queen of the Nile (1961)  Nefertiti, Vincent Price
 Son of Cleopatra (1964) Mark Damon

Babylon / the Middle East
 Ali Baba and the Seven Saracens (1962)  Sinbad Against the 7 Saracens, starring Gordon Mitchell
 Anthar, The Invincible (1964)  Devil of the Desert Against the Son of Hercules, starring Kirk Morris, directed by Antonio Margheriti
 Desert Warrior (1957)  The Desert Lovers, Ricardo Montalban
 Falcon of the Desert (1965)  The Magnificent Challenge, starring Kirk Morris
 Golden Arrow, The (1962) directed by Antonio Margheriti
 Goliath at the Conquest of Baghdad (1964)  Goliath at the Conquest of Damascus, Peter Lupus
 Goliath and the Rebel Slave (1963)  The Tyrant of Lydia vs. The Son of Hercules, Gordon Scott
 Goliath and the Sins of Babylon (1963)  Maciste, the World's Greatest Hero, Mark Forest
 Hercules and the Tyrants of Babylon (1964)
 Hero of Babylon (1963)  The Beast of Babylon vs. the Son of Hercules, Gordon Scott
 Kindar, the Invulnerable (1965) Mark Forest, Rosalba Neri
 Missione sabbie roventi (Mission Burning Sands) (1966) starring Renato Rossini, directed by Alfonso Brescia
 Red Sheik, The (1962)
 Scheherazade (1963) starring Anna Karina
 Seven Tasks of Ali Baba, The (1962)  Ali Baba and the Sacred Crown, starring Richard Lloyd
 Slave Girls of Sheba (1963) starring Linda Cristal
 Slave Queen of Babylon (1962) Yvonne Furneaux
 Son of the Sheik (1961)  Kerim, Son of the Sheik, starring Gordon Scott
 Sword of Damascus, The (1964)  The Thief of Damascus
 Sword of Islam, The (1961) a.k.a. Love and Faith; an Italian/ Egyptian co-production
 Thief of Baghdad, The (1961) Steve Reeves
 War Gods of Babylon (1962)  The Seventh Thunderbolt
 Wonders of Aladdin, The (1961) Donald O'Connor

The second peplum wave: the 1980s

After the peplum gave way to the spaghetti Western and Eurospy films in 1965, the genre lay dormant for close to 20 years. Then in 1982, the box-office successes of Jean-Jacques Annaud's Quest for Fire (1981), Arnold Schwarzenegger's Conan the Barbarian (1982) and Clash of the Titans (1981 film) (1981) spurred a second renaissance of sword and sorcery Italian pepla in the five years immediately following. Most of these films had low budgets, focusing more on barbarians and pirates so as to avoid the need for expensive Greco-Roman sets. The filmmakers tried to compensate for their shortcomings with the addition of some graphic gore and nudity. Many of these 1980s entries were helmed by noted Italian horror film directors (Joe D'Amato, Lucio Fulci, Luigi Cozzi, etc.) and many featured actors Lou Ferrigno, Miles O'Keeffe and Sabrina Siani. Here is a list of the 1980s pepla:
 Adam and Eve (1983)  Adamo ed Eva, la prima storia d'amore, contains stock footage from One Million Years B.C. (1966)
 Ator, the Fighting Eagle (1983)  Ator the Invincible, starring Miles O'Keeffe and Sabrina Siani, directed by Joe D'Amato
 Ator 2: The Blade Master (1985)  Cave Dwellers, starring Miles O'Keefe, directed by Joe D'Amato
 Ator 3: Iron Warrior (1986)  Iron Warrior, starring Miles O'Keeffe, directed by Alfonso Brescia (Joe D'Amato disowned this entry in the Ator saga, since it was done without his involvement)
 Ator 4: Quest for the Mighty Sword (1989)  Quest for the Mighty Sword, starring Eric Allan Kramer (as the son of Ator), Laura Gemser and Marisa Mell, directed by Joe D'Amato
 Barbarian Master (1984)  Sangraal, the Sword of Fire,  Sword of the Barbarians, starring Sabrina Siani
 The Barbarians (1987)  The Barbarians and Company, semi-comedy starring Peter and David Paul, directed by Ruggero Deodato
 The Cantabrians (1980)  Los Cantabros, directed by Paul Naschy in Spain
 Conqueror of the World (1983)  I padroni del mondo / Fathers of the World,  Master of the World (a barbarian movie set in prehistoric times) directed by Alberto Cavallone
 Conquest (1983)  Conquest of the Lost Land, starring Sabrina Siani, directed by Lucio Fulci
 Hercules (1983) starring Lou Ferrigno and Sybil Danning, directed by Luigi Cozzi
 Hercules 2 (1984)  The Adventures of Hercules, starring Lou Ferrigno, directed by Luigi Cozzi
 Hundra (1983) Italian/ Spanish "Red Sonja" ripoff directed by Matt Cimber
 The Invincible Barbarian (1982)  Gunan, the Warrior,  Gunan, King of the Barbarians, starring Sabrina Siani, directed by Franco Prosperi
 Ironmaster (1983)  The War of Iron, co-starring Luigi Montefiori, directed by Umberto Lenzi
 The Seven Magnificent Gladiators (1983) starring Lou Ferrigno and Dan Vadis
 She (1982) starring Sandahl Bergman and Gordon Mitchell
 Sinbad of the Seven Seas (1988) starring Lou Ferrigno, directed by Luigi Cozzi
 Thor, the Conqueror (1983) directed by Tonino Ricci
 The Throne of Fire (1983) starring Sabrina Siani, directed by Franco Prosperi
 Yor, the Hunter from the Future (1983) starring Reb Brown, directed by Antonio Margheriti (a barbarian film that has science fiction elements in the story)

A group of so-called "porno peplum" films were devoted to Roman emperors, especially - but not only - to Caligula and Claudius' spouse Messalina:
 Caligula (1979) directed by Tinto Brass
 A Filha de Calígula/ The Daughter of Caligula (1981) directed by Ody Fraga; made in Brazil
 Caligula and Messalina (1981) directed by Bruno Mattei
 Bacanales Romanas/ My Nights with Messalina (1982) directed in Spain by Jaime J. Puig; stars Ajita Wilson
 Nerone and Poppea (1982) directed by Bruno Mattei
 Caligula... The Untold Story (1982) directed by Joe D'Amato, starring Laura Gemser and Gabriele Tinti
 Orgies of Caligula (1984)  Caligula's Slaves,  Roma, l'antica chiave dei sensi; directed by Lorenzo Onorati

See also 

 Cinema of Italy
 Greco-Roman antiquity
 Middle Ages
 The Bible in film

References

Further reading 
 Diak, Nicholas, editor. The New Peplum: Essays on Sword and Sandal Films and Television Programs Since the 1990s. McFarland and Company, Inc. 2018. 
 Richard Dyer: "The White Man's Muscles" in R. Dyer: White: London: Routledge: 1997: 
 David Chapman: Retro Studs: Muscle Movie Posters from Around the World: Portland: Collectors Press: 2002: 
 Hervé Dumont, L'Antiquité au cinéma. Vérités, légendes et manipulations (Nouveau-Monde, 2009)
 Florent Fourcart, Le Péplum italien (1946–1966) : Grandeur et décadence d'une antiquité populaire (2012, CinExploitation)
 Maggie Gunsberg: "Heroic Bodies: The Culture of Masculinity in Peplums" in M. Gunsberg: Italian Cinema: Gender and Genre: Houndsmill: Palgrave Macmillan: 2005: 
 Patrick Lucanio, With Fire and Sword: Italian Spectacles on American Screens, 1958–1968 (Scarecrow Press, 1994)
 Irmbert Schenk: "The Cinematic Support to Nationalist(ic) Mythology: The Italian Peplum 1910–1930" in Natascha Gentz and Stefan Kramer (eds.) Globalization, Cultural Identities and Media Representations Albany, NY: State University of New York Press: 2006: 
 Stephen Flacassier: "Muscles, Myths and Movies": Rabbit's Garage: 1994 :

External links 
 Films
 The Avenger by Georgia Rivalta. Steve Reeves stars as Aeneas.
 Hercules Unchained (Pietro Francisci, director.)
 The Giant of Metropolis (starring Gordon Mitchell; Umberto Scarpelli, director)
 Hercules and the Tyrants of Babylon (Domenico Paolella, dir.)

 Images and discussion
 The Many Faces of Hercules at Brian's Drive-In Theatre
 PEPLVM - Images de l'Antiquité, par Michel Eloy (in French)
 Cinéma & Histoire: L'Antiquité au Cinéma (in French), by Hervé Dumont.
 Vincent Price, B Movies, Film Noir, Bela Lugosi, Boris Karloff, Peter Cushing,Christopher Lee,Barbara Steele,horror,sci-fi,B westerns,sword & sandal (source of peplum DVD's)
 Something Weird Video (source of peplum DVD's)
 Santo And Friends (filmography of Mexican muscleman films)

Film genres
Historical fiction
 
Italian films by genre
20th century in Italy
Fantasy genres
Classical antiquity in modern art and culture